Jessica Mary Ellen Foley (born 20 April 1983) is a retired Australian basketballer and Australian rules footballer. As a basketballer, Foley represented Australia at both junior and senior levels and played for Duke in college basketball in the United States. As an Australian rules footballer, Foley played for the Adelaide Football Club in the AFL Women's (AFLW), playing in an AFL Women's premiership in her first season.

Basketball career
Foley commenced playing in the Women's National Basketball League (WNBL) in 1999. Since then, Foley has played for the AIS (1999/00 to 2000/01) and Adelaide Lightning (2006/07 to current).

In season 2007/08, Foley was selected to the WNBL All-Star Five. In 2011, Foley won the Halls Medal for the best and fairest player in the South Australian Women's competition.

Between 2002 and 2006, Foley attended Duke University in North Carolina and played for the Blue Devils. As a junior, Foley set a single season record with 68 three-pointers made.

In the 2006 WNBA draft, Foley was selected in round 3 (pick 38 overall) by the Indiana Fever, but did not play because of injury. In 2008, Foley was traded to the Connecticut Sun, but returned to Australia without playing a WNBA game.

At official FIBA events, Foley played for Australia at the 2001 World Championship for Junior Women, the 2003 World Championship for Young Women and the 2009 FIBA Oceania Championship for Women, where she won a Gold medal.

Duke statistics
Source

AFLW career
Foley was drafted by Adelaide at pick no. 30 in the 2018 national draft. In March 2020, she retired to focus on her medical career.

Following her retirement, Foley has been a ruck coach and team doctor at Geelong in 2021 and will join the club's AFLW coaching panel for the 2022 AFL Women's season as an assistant coach with responsibility for the defence.

See also
 WNBL All-Star Five

References

External links
 
 

1983 births
Living people
Adelaide Football Club (AFLW) players
Adelaide Lightning players
Australian expatriate basketball people in the United States
Australian Institute of Sport basketball (WNBL) players
Australian rules footballers from New South Wales
Australian women's basketball players
Duke Blue Devils women's basketball players
Indiana Fever draft picks
Small forwards
Sportswomen from New South Wales